NGC 4212 is a flocculent spiral galaxy with LINER activity located about 53 million light-years away in the constellation Coma Berenices. The galaxy was discovered by astronomer William Herschel on April 8, 1784 and was listed in the NGC catalog as NGC 4208. He then observed the same galaxy and listed it as NGC 4212. Astronomer John Louis Emil Dreyer later concluded that NGC 4208 was identical to NGC 4212. NGC 4212 is a member of the Virgo Cluster.

See also
 List of NGC objects (4001–5000)
 NGC 4414
 NGC 4051 - similar looking galaxy

References

External links

4212
39224
Coma Berenices
Virgo Cluster
Astronomical objects discovered in 1784
Flocculent spiral galaxies
7275
LINER galaxies